Fang Liufang (Chinese: 方流芳; Pinyin: Fāng Liúfāng; born 1953) was Co-Dean of the China-EU School of Law. He is best known for his work on civil law, contract law and tort law, as well as his recent work on legal education in China.

Background
Fang was born in January 1953 in Wuxi, China.  He graduated from Nanjing University in 1982 with a B.A in Chinese Medicine and graduated with a Master in Chinese Law from Renmin University in 1992. He was appointed by the Ministry of Education of the P. R. China to participate in the 'Joint PhD Training Program' at Columbia Law School between February 1989 and September 1990, before being awarded a doctorate in civil law from Renmin University in 1991.

He worked as a lecturer of law at Renmin University between 1988 and 1992, before being promoted to Associate Professor in Law in 1993. In 1996 he spent a year as a visiting scholar at Harvard Law School. He moved to the China University of Political Science and Law in 1997. Fang worked as a Senior Researcher at Harvard Law School in 2002 and 2003. In 2005 he was promoted to Vice President of the Academic Degrees Committee of CUPL. Fang was the Dean of the School of Juris Master at CUPL (2005-2008) and Co-Dean of CESL (2008-2012).He is currently the director of Center of Corporate Law at CUPL.

Personal
Fang Liufang resides in Beijing, China.  He was a member of the Expert Consultancy Committee of the China International Economic and Trade Arbitration Committee (CIETAC) and an Arbitrator for the Beijing Arbitration Commission.

He was an Expert Consultant, Subcommittee on Amendments to the 'Law of the People' s Republic of China on Partnerships' of the Financial and Economic Committee of the National People's Congress (NPC) Standing Committee from 2002 to 2006, an Expert Consultant on the 'Telecommunications Law' Drafting Committee under the Ministry of Information Industry from 2003 to 2006, an Expert Consultant on the 'Law of the People's Republic of China on Individual Proprietorship Enterprises' Drafting Committee from 1994 to 1996 and an Expert Consultant on the 'Corporate Law' Drafting Committee under the Legislative Affairs Commission of the NPC Standing Committee from 1992 to 1993. He worked as an Expert Member of the Share Issuance Examination Committee under the China Securities Regulatory Commission from 2002 to 2003 and was also Member, State-owned Assets Supervision and Administration Commission of the Beijing Municipal Government from 2004 to 2006.

Selected publications
Articles
 "China's Corporatization Experiment" Duke Journal of Comparative & International Law, 149, 181-85 (1995)
 “Taking Academic Games Seriously," Perspective Vol. 3 No.7
 The Governmental Role in M&A in China: The Kodak Case
 Beyond Reasonable Doubt: University Teaching Losing Its Appeal
 Approval Procedures for the Establishment of Companies in China
 Chinese Partnerships

In Chinese
 Legal Representatives of State Owned Enterprises: Status, Power and Interest.
 Defining Chinese Corporations
 Report on Chinese Legal Education

External links
 Fang Liufang's profile at the China University of Political Science and Law.
 Fang Liufang's profile at the China-EU School of Law.

1953 births
Living people
Educators from Wuxi
Columbia University people
Renmin University of China alumni
Harvard University faculty
Chinese legal scholars